Kat kyi kaik, also specifically called Myeik kat kyi kaik, is a spicy Burmese fried noodle dish associated with the coastal town of Myeik (formerly Mergui) in Southern Myanmar.

It consists of wide, flat rice noodles fried with squid slices, bean sprouts, prawns, steamed garden pea (pe byok), spring onion, pepper and dark soy sauce. It is popular locally where it is found in the Southern coastal region of Myanmar and in Yangon.

The dish gets the name kat kyi kaik because while the noodle and ingredients are being fried in a wok, the cook uses scissors to cut up the noodles for easier cooking and serving.

A comparable dish is char kway teow, a popular dish in Singapore and Malaysia. Beik kut kyee kaik only uses prawns and squid as main ingredients.

References

See also 
 Meeshay - a rice noodle dish associated with Shan State in Eastern Myanmar 
 Mont di - a rice noodle dish associated with Rakhine State in Western Myanmar

Burmese cuisine
Shrimp dishes
Squid dishes
Fried noodles